Clelia Conterno Guglielminetti (born Clelia Guglielminetti 18 February 1915 - 22 January 1984) was an Italian Esperantist.

Life 
Clelia Guglielminetti was born on 18 February 1915 in Turin to a lawyer father and director of an insurance company, and a housewife mother. She studied at the Massimo d'Azeglio classical high school in Turin, and in 1938, obtained a doctorate in Belles-lettres, with a thesis on Louise-Marie Gonzague, wife of two kings of Poland. She taught in a high school, as well as with children with polio.

In 1939, she married Cesare Conterno, a doctor in mathematics and actuary; they had a son, Renato, in 1956. During the Second World War, her husband was imprisoned in a Nazi concentration camp. She participated in the magazine In Marcia!. Between 1957 and 1977, she wrote four books in Italian: two collections of poems and two novels. She retired in 1980 and died in Turin on January 22, 1984.

She learned Esperanto and took part in its first universal congress in 1934. In 1935, she contributed to reviews in La Pirato and L’esperanto. After the Second World War, she became director of Esperanto and vice-president of the Italian Federation of Esperanto. She was also editor of Literatura Foiro and Rivista Italiana di Esperanto.

Works 

 Una piccola vita, 1957
 La tempesta, 1959
 In tanti a dire di no, 1968
 Eta Vivo, 1969.
 Bambino mio tanto atteso, 1971
 Du poemoj de Clelia Conterno  Guglielminetti

References

External links 
 Conterno Guglielminetti Clelia archivi.polodel900.it
 AVINJO de Clelia Conterno Guglielminetti el “Paŝoj al Plena Posedo” de William Auld.

Italian Esperantists
1915 births
1984 deaths